The 2011 Australian Open Grand Prix Gold was a badminton tournament which took place at the Melbourne Sports and Aquatic Centre in Melbourne, Australia on 5–10 April 2011 and had a total purse of $120,000. This is for the first time Australian Open was rated as a Grand Prix Gold event, where before in 2009–2010 were a Grand Prix events.

Men's singles

Seeds

 Boonsak Ponsana (quarterfinals)
 Nguyễn Tiến Minh (quarterfinals)
 Hu Yun (third round)
 Alamsyah Yunus (withdrew)
 Kazushi Yamada (third round)
 Sho Sasaki (champion)
 Brice Leverdez (third round)
 Wong Choong Hann (final)
 Tommy Sugiarto (semifinals)
 Muhammad Hafiz Hashim (third round)
 Wong Wing Ki (third round)
 Sony Dwi Kuncoro (withdrew)
 Arvind Bhat (third round)
 Mathieu Lo Ying Ping (third round)
 Chan Yan Kit (semifinals)
 R. M. V. Gurusaidutt (first round)

Finals

Top half

Section 1

Section 2

Section 3

Section 4

Bottom half

Section 1

Section 2

Section 3

Section 4

Women's singles

Seeds

 Liu Xin (champion)
 Yip Pui Yin (first round)
 Salakjit Ponsana (first round)
 Tai Tzu-ying (quarterfinals)
 Ai Goto (first round)
 Porntip Buranaprasertsuk (finals)
 Ratchanok Intanon (semifinals)
 Sayaka Sato (quarterfinals)

Finals

Men's doubles

Seeds

  Hirokatsu Hashimoto / Noriyasu Hirata (semifinals)
  Hendra Aprida Gunawan / Alvent Yulianto (semifinals)
  Gan Teik Chai / Tan Bin Shen (quarterfinals)
  Naoki Kawamae / Shoji Sato (final)
  Hiroyuki Endo / Kenichi Hayakawa (champion)
  Songphon Anugritayawon / Sudket Prapakamol (second round)
  Yoshiteru Hirobe / Kenta Kazuno (first round)
  Chen Chung-jen / Lin Yen-jui (quarterfinals)

Finals

Women's doubles

Seeds

  Mizuki Fujii / Reika Kakiiwa (quarterfinals)
  Duanganong Aroonkesorn / Kunchala Voravichitchaikul (second round)
  Shinta Mulia Sari / Yao Lei (quarterfinals)
  Shizuka Matsuo / Mami Naito (champion)

Finals

Mixed doubles

Seeds

  Sudket Prapakamol / Saralee Thoungthongkam (semifinals)
  Songphon Anugritayawon / Kunchala Voravichitchaikul (champion)
  Shintaro Ikeda / Reiko Shiota (semifinals)
  Wong Wai Hong / Chau Hoi Wah (quarterfinals)
  Hirokatsu Hashimoto / Mizuki Fujii (final)
  Nova Widianto / Vita Marissa (quarterfinals)
  Raj Veeran / Renuga Veeran (quarterfinals)
  Hock Lai Lee / Priscilla Lun (second round)

Finals

References

External links
 Tournament Link

Australian Open (badminton)
Australia
Badminton Australian Open
Australian Open